Baħar iċ-Ċagħaq Redoubt is a redoubt in Baħar iċ-Ċagħaq, limits of Naxxar, Malta. It was built in 1715–1716 by the Order of Saint John as one of a series of coastal fortifications around the Maltese Islands. Today, the redoubt still exists and is in relatively good condition.

It is also known as Vendôme Redoubt or Madliena Redoubt.

History
Baħar iċ-Ċagħaq Redoubt was built in 1715–1716 as part of the first building programme of redoubts in Malta. The nearest fortifications to the redoubt were Qalet Marku Battery to the northwest (now demolished) and Madliena Tower to the east. The redoubt was originally linked to the latter tower by an entrenchment, but very little remains of this have survived.

The redoubt consists of a pentagonal platform with short flanks and a low parapet, with a rectangular blockhouse located at the centre of its gorge. The blockhouse is divided into two rooms, with the larger room containing the main entrance.

In World War II, a defensive position was built on the salient of the redoubt.

Present day
Today, the redoubt is still in relatively good condition. It is leased to a private tenant and is used as a bar and restaurant named Las Palmas.

Gallery

References

External links

National Inventory of the Cultural Property of the Maltese Islands

Redoubts in Malta
Hospitaller fortifications in Malta
Military installations established in 1715
World War II sites in Malta
Naxxar
Limestone buildings in Malta
National Inventory of the Cultural Property of the Maltese Islands
18th-century fortifications
1715 establishments in Malta
18th Century military history of Malta